Selenous acid (or selenious acid) is the chemical compound with the formula . It is the principal oxoacid of selenium; the other being selenic acid.

Formation and properties
Selenous acid is analogous to sulfurous acid, but it is more readily isolated. Selenous acid is easily formed upon the addition of selenium dioxide to water. As a crystalline solid, the compound can be seen as pyramidal molecules that are interconnected with hydrogen bonds. In solution it is a diprotic acid:
 (pKa = 2.62)
 (pKa = 8.32)

It is moderately oxidizing in nature, but kinetically slow. In 1 M :
 (Eo = +0.74 V)

In 1 M :
 (Eo = −0.37 V)

Selenous acid is hygroscopic.

Uses
The major use is in protecting and changing the color of steel, especially steel parts on firearms. The so-called cold-bluing process uses selenous acid, copper(II) nitrate, and nitric acid to change the color of the steel from silver-grey to blue-grey or black. Alternative procedures use copper sulfate and phosphoric acid instead. This process deposits a coating of copper selenide and is fundamentally different from other bluing processes which generate black iron oxide. Some older razor blades were also made of blued steel.

Another use for selenious acid is the chemical darkening and patination of copper, brass and bronze, producing a rich dark brown color that can be further enhanced with mechanical abrasion.

It is used in organic synthesis as an oxidizing agent for the synthesis of 1,2-dicarbonyl compounds, e.g. in laboratory preparation of glyoxal (ethane-1,2-dione) from acetaldehyde.

Selenious acid is a key component of the Mecke reagent used for drug checking.

Medical 
Selenous acid can supply the trace element indicated in people as a source of selenium.

Health effects
Like many selenium compounds, selenous acid is highly toxic in excessive quantities, and ingestion of any significant quantity of selenous acid is usually fatal, however it is an approved dietary source in proper amounts. Symptoms of selenium poisoning can occur several hours after exposure, and may include stupor, nausea, severe hypotension and death.

References

External links 
 

Hydrogen compounds
Oxidizing acids
Oxidizing agents
Oxoacids
Selenium(IV) compounds
X